Fuu may refer to:

 Furu language
 Fuu Hououji, a character in Magic Knight Rayearth
 Fuu, a character in Samurai Champloo